Fabio Gerli (born 23 December 1996) is an Italian professional footballer who plays as a midfielder for  club Modena.

Career
On 25 August 2020 he joined Modena.

References

1996 births
Living people
Footballers from Rome
Italian footballers
Association football midfielders
Serie B players
Serie C players
Virtus Entella players
Santarcangelo Calcio players
Bassano Virtus 55 S.T. players
A.C.N. Siena 1904 players
Modena F.C. players
Italy youth international footballers